The Aichi AB-2 was a prototype Japanese reconnaissance floatplane of the 1930s. It was a single-engined biplane, of which two examples were built, but no production followed.

Design and development

In 1929, Tetsuo Miki, a designer at Aichi Tokei Denki Kabushiki Kaisha (Aichi Watch and Electrical Machinery Company) started the design of a catapult launched reconnaissance floatplane with the aim of replacing the Nakajima E2N aboard the Imperial Japanese Navy's warships. Miki's design was a small single-engined biplane. Its fuselage was of steel tube construction with fabric covering, while it had wooden wings that folded to the rear for storage aboard ship. Powerplant was a 330 hp (246 kW) Aichi AC-1, an experimental radial engine. The two-man crew sat in open cockpits, while the aircraft's undercarriage consisted of twin floats.

The two prototypes were completed and flown in 1930. The AC-1 engine was not successful, however, and the project was abandoned after one of the prototypes was destroyed when an exhaust fire spread to the fuselage. The type did form the basis of the later Aichi AB-3 floatplane, of which a single example was built in 1932 for China.

Specifications

See also

Notes

References

Mikesh, Robert C and Shorzoe Abe. Japanese Aircraft 1910–1941. London:Putnam, 1990. .

AB-2
1930s Japanese military reconnaissance aircraft
Floatplanes
Biplanes
Single-engined tractor aircraft
Aircraft first flown in 1930